The Saluva dynasty was created by the Saluvas, who by historical tradition were natives of the Kalyani region of northern Karnataka in modern India. The Gorantla inscription traces their origins to this region from the time of the Western Chalukyas and Kalachuris of Karnataka. The term "Saluva" is known to lexicographers as "hawk" used in hunting. They later spread into the east coast of modern Andhra Pradesh, perhaps by migration or during the Vijayanagara conquests during the 14th century.

The earliest known Saluva from inscriptional evidence in the Vijayanagara era was Mangaldeva, the great grandfather of Saluva Narasimha Deva Raya. Mangaldeva played an important role in the victories of King Bukka Raya I against the Sultanate of Madurai. His descendants founded the Saluva Dynasty and were one of the ruling lines of the Vijayanagara Empire of Southern India. Three kings ruled from 1485 to 1505 after which the Tuluva Dynasty claimed the throne. They ruled almost the entire South India with Vijaynagara as their capital.

Saluva Narasimha was the first king of the dynasty ruling from 1486–1491. Narasimha spent his reign in relatively successful campaigns to reduce his vassals throughout the kingdom to submission and in unsuccessful attempts to stop the encroachment of the Suryavamsa king of Orissa. Narasimha also opened new ports on the west coast so that he could revive the horse trade, which had fallen into Bahmanī hands.

At his death in 1491, following the siege of Udayagiri and his own imprisonment there by the Suryavamsi king of Orissa, Narasimha left his kingdom in the hands of his chief minister, Narasa Nayaka. The King did not think his sons were ready to take charge of the throne so he gave that power to his most trusted general and minister Narasa. The minister in effect ruled Vijayanagar from 1490 until his own death in 1503. Narasimha's eldest son, Thimma Bhupa, was murdered by an army commander and one of Narasa's enemies in 1492 so Narasimha's youngest son, Narasimha Raya II, ascended his brother to the throne as king. He was enthroned as Immadi Narasimha. Although he was named king, the authentic control came from Narasa's eldest son and successor, best known as Vira Narasimha. He ordered the murder of Immadi Narasimha in 1505. He then ascended the throne and inaugurated the Tuluva dynasty, the third dynasty of Vijayanagar and reigned from 1503-1509.

List of rulers 
 Saluva Narasimha Deva Raya (1485–1491 CE), first ruler
 Thimma Bhupala (1491 CE)
 Narasimha Raya II (1491–1505 CE), last ruler

Architecture 
Chaturmukha Basadi, Gerusoppa was constructed during the reign of Saluva dynasty.

See also 
 Vijaynagar Empire
 Rani Chennabhairadevi

Notes

References
 WebPage by Dr. Jyothsna Kamat
 Durga Prasad, History of the Andhras Till 1565 A.D., P. G. Publishers, Guntur
 WebPage by Britannica

History of Karnataka